Harvey Slocum (October 23, 1887 – November 11, 1961) was an American civil engineer and dam-building expert, known primarily for his part in the construction of Grand Coulee Dam in the United States and the Bhakra Dam in India.

Slocum started out as a labourer in a steel mill and rose to the position of construction superintendent of the Grand Coulee Dam.
Harvey Slocum was then Construction Superintendent of the Bull Shoals Dam built between 1947 and 1951.

Slocum joined the Bhakra Dam construction project as chief engineer in 1952 and imprinted on it his own distinctive style of working. He was a flamboyant personality who drove a current model powder blue cadillac convertible; not expected of an engineer in those times in India.
Many workers from the United States Bull Shoals Dam project joined Slocum on the construction of the Bhakra Dam. A small city was constructed to house the U.S. workers.
Slocum died in New Delhi at age 74.

Notes

References
 Downs, L. Vaughn. (1993). The mightiest of them all: memories of Grand Coulee Dam. New York: ASCE Press. ;  OCLC 28890824

American civil engineers
1887 births
1961 deaths